Steve Rutter (born 24 July 1968) is a former professional footballer who played as a forward in The Football League for Maidstone United

References

1968 births
Living people
Footballers from Erith
Association football forwards
English footballers
Kettering Town F.C. players
Maidstone United F.C. (1897) players
Worcester City F.C. players
English Football League players